

The Savoia-Pomilio SP.4 was a reconnaissance and bomber aircraft built in Italy during the First World War. It was a further development of the family of designs that had started with the SP.1. Ultimately all of these took their basic configuration from the Farman MF.11: a biplane with twin tails and a fuselage nacelle that accommodated the crew and a pusher-mounted engine. However, the SP.4 differed both from its Farman antecedent and the previous Savoia-Pomilio designs by featuring twin engines mounted in the interplane gap in place of the single engine in the nacelle. Removing the engine from this position allowed a second machine gun to be placed there instead.

Apart from their intended role as a reconnaissance aircraft and bomber, some SP.4s were used to insert spies and saboteurs behind enemy lines. A further development designated SP.5 remained unbuilt by the end of the war.

Operators

Corpo Aeronautico Militare

Specifications

Notes

References
 
 
 

Savoia-Pomilio aircraft
1910s Italian military reconnaissance aircraft
1910s Italian bomber aircraft
Biplanes
Aircraft first flown in 1917